Fannin County is a county located in the north central portion of the U.S. state of Georgia. As of the 2020 census, the population was 25,319. It is one of the most rural counties in Georgia due its location in the Appalachian Mountain Range, with about 90% of the population of Fannin County living in unincorporated lands. The county seat is Blue Ridge. The county was created on January 21, 1854 and is named after James Fannin, a veteran who fought in the Texas Revolution.

History
Prior to European colonization, the area that is now Fannin County was inhabited by the Cherokee people and other Indigenous peoples for thousands of years.

Fannin County was founded on January 12, 1854, taken from 396 square miles that were previously part of Gilmer and Union counties. The county is named for Georgia native James W. Fannin, who fought and died during the Texas Revolution.

Although the county was majority pro-secession at the beginning of the Civil War, wartime conditions inspired a notable number of anti-Confederate "Tories" as early as 1862, many of whom re-located to pro-Union areas of Tennessee for the duration. This contributed to the postwar establishment of a countywide Republican Party earlier and more sustained than almost any other county in Georgia.

Geography
The county is located in the Blue Ridge Mountains.

The Toccoa River, which rises in adjacent Union County, flows northward across Fannin County into Tennessee, where it becomes the Ocoee River.  Blue Ridge Lake, created in the 1930s by the completion of Blue Ridge Dam (now operated by the Tennessee Valley Authority), spans a substantial stretch of the river in the northern part of the county.

The vast majority of Fannin County is located in the Ocoee River sub-basin of the Middle Tennessee-Hiwassee basin. A very small northeastern portion of Fannin County is located in the Hiwassee River sub-basin of the same Middle Tennessee-Hiwassee basin. Illustrating that watershed boundaries and county boundaries have little in common, Fannin County's southernmost corner is located in the Etowah River sub-basin in the ACT River Basin (Coosa-Tallapoosa River Basin), while two slivers of the county's southwestern area are located in the Coosawattee River sub-basin of the same larger ACT River Basin.  Finally, a western portion of the county is located in the Conasauga River sub-basin of the ACT River Basin.

Adjacent counties
 Cherokee County, North Carolina - northeast
 Union County - east
 Dawson County - southeast
 Lumpkin County - southeast
 Gilmer County - southwest
 Murray County - west
 Polk County, Tennessee - north

National protected area
 Chattahoochee National Forest (part)

Transportation

Major highways
  U.S. Route 76
  State Route 2
  State Route 5
  State Route 60
  State Route 60 Spur
  State Route 515

Secondary highways

 Old U.S. Highway 76 Also Old S.R. 2
 Loving Road
 Old S.R. 2
 Aska Road
 Madola Road
 Lebanon Road
 Mobile Road
 Curtis Switch Road
 Galloway Road
 Doublehead Gap Road
 Skeenah Gap Road

Demographics

2000 census
As of the census of 2000, there were 19,798 people, 8,369 households, and 6,008 families living in the county.  The population density was 51 people per square mile (20/km2).  There were 11,134 housing units at an average density of 29 per square mile (11/km2).  The racial makeup of the county was 99.9% White, 0.2% Black or African American, 0.1% Native American, 0.2% Asian, 0.05% Pacific Islander, 0.0% from other races, and 0.0% from two or more races.  0.0% of the population were Hispanic or Latino of any race.

There were 8,369 households, out of which 25.90% had children under the age of 18 living with them, 59.80% were married couples living together, 8.90% had a female householder with no husband present, and 28.20% were non-families. 25.60% of all households were made up of individuals, and 12.80% had someone living alone who was 65 years of age or older.  The average household size was 2.35 and the average family size was 2.80.

In the county, the population was spread out, with 20.90% under the age of 18, 7.00% from 18 to 24, 24.90% from 25 to 44, 28.20% from 45 to 64, and 19.00% who were 65 years of age or older.  The median age was 43 years. For every 100 females there were 93.50 males.  For every 100 females age 18 and over, there were 90.80 males.

The median income for a household in the county was $30,612, and the median income for a family was $35,258. Males had a median income of $28,728 versus $21,246 for females. The per capita income for the county was $16,269.  About 10.20% of families and 12.40% of the population were below the poverty line, including 14.10% of those under age 18 and 14.20% of those age 65 or over.

2010 census
As of the 2010 United States Census, there were 23,682 people, 10,187 households, and 7,016 families living in the county. The racial makeup of the county was 97.1% white, 0.4% black or African American, 0.3% Asian, 0.3% American Indian, 0.7% from other races, and 1.2% from two or more races. Those of Hispanic or Latino origin made up 1.8% of the population. In terms of ancestry, 18.6% were Irish, 13.3% were American, 11.5% were English, and 9.5% were German.

Of the 10,187 households, 25.1% had children under the age of 18 living with them, 55.2% were married couples living together, 9.5% had a female householder with no husband present, 31.1% were non-families, and 27.1% of all households were made up of individuals. The average household size was 2.31 and the average family size was 2.77. The median age was 48.3 years.

The median income for a household in the county was $34,145 and the median income for a family was $41,422. Males had a median income of $34,875 versus $27,097 for females. The per capita income for the county was $21,103. About 12.2% of families and 16.2% of the population were below the poverty line, including 23.0% of those under age 18 and 13.8% of those age 65 or over.

2020 census

As of the 2020 United States census, there were 25,319 people, 10,408 households, and 7,083 families residing in the county.

Communities

Cities
 Blue Ridge
 McCaysville
 Morganton

Census-designated places
 Epworth
 Mineral Bluff (incorporated until 1995)

Unincorporated communities
 Hemptown

Politics
Politically, Fannin County is a massive outlier in Georgia. As an entirely white highland county historically devoid of slaves, it is one of the few ancestrally Republican counties in a state that was heavily Democratic nationally until the 1960s and at other levels well into the 1990s. Since the 1870s it has been solidly Republican, displaying voting patterns similar to those of East Tennessee. Fannin was the only county in the Deep South that never voted for Franklin D. Roosevelt. The only three Democrats to win an absolute majority in the county since the Civil War have been Samuel J. Tilden in 1876, William Jennings Bryan in 1900 and Georgia native Jimmy Carter in 1976 when he carried every county in his home state. Besides Carter, Woodrow Wilson was the only Democrat to win even a plurality of the county's vote in the 20th century. Bill Clinton is the last Democrat to win even 40 percent of the county's vote.

The current county government consists of a three-member county commission consisting of a chairman and commissioners representing two posts.

See also

 National Register of Historic Places listings in Fannin County, Georgia
List of counties in Georgia

References

External links
 Fannin County Chamber of Commerce
 The News Observer
 Fannin County Website
 Fannin County historical marker

 
1854 establishments in Georgia (U.S. state)
Georgia (U.S. state) counties
Northeast Georgia
Counties of Appalachia